William Swann is a professor of social and personality psychology.

William Swann may also refer to:

 William Francis Gray Swann, Anglo-American physicist 
 William Dale Swann, American character actor
 William Dorsey Swann, American former slave and activist, known as the first drag queen
 Willie Swann, rugby league player
 Billy Swann, musician in The Muffins and Urban Verbs

See also
 William Swan (disambiguation)